Medņeva Parish is an administrative unit of Balvi Municipality in the Latgale region of Latvia.

Towns, villages and settlements of Medņeva parish 
  – parish administrative center.

References 

Parishes of Latvia
Balvi Municipality
Latgale